This article lists events that occurred during 1972 in Estonia.

Incumbents

Chairman of the Supreme Soviet is Ilmar Vahe.
Chairman  of the Supreme Soviet Presidium is Artur Vader.
Chairman of the Council of Ministers is Valter Klauson.

Events
May 5 – Viru Hotel was opened.

Births
3 February – Mart Poom, Estonian footballer

Deaths

Cinematography 
In 1972 Tallinnfilm company made movies:
Väike reekviem suupillile ('Little Requiem for the Harmonica')
Maaletulek ('To Come to the Shore')
Verekivi ('Bloody Stone')

References

 
1970s in Estonia
Estonia
Estonia
Years of the 20th century in Estonia